Dietl is a surname. Notable people with the surname include:

Bo Dietl (born 1950), American police detective, media personality and 2017 NYC mayoral candidate 
Eduard Dietl (1890–1944), German general 
Helmut Dietl (1944–2015), German film director and writer
Jaroslav Dietl (1929–1985), Czechoslovak scenarist of series 
Józef Dietl (1804–1878), mayor of Kraków